Lovre Bašić (born 10 January 1995) is a Croatian professional basketball player currently playing for Alkar of the Croatian League. Standing at 1.90 m, he plays at the point guard position.

Playing career 
Bašić grew up playing as a point guard for Zadar of the Croatian League. On the beginning of the 2015–16 season he became the second youngest captain in history of the club, Giuseppe Gjergja being the only younger one in 1957.

In August, 2019, he moved to Vrijednosnice Osijek.

In May 2020, Bašić moved to Liège Basket of the Belgian League. He parted ways with the team on September 21, 2021.

In November, 2021, Bašić signed with Jazine, the development team of Zadar competing in the Croatian second-tier Prva muška liga. He averaged 12 points, 5.8 assists, 2.6 rebounds, and 1.4 steals per game. 

On February 9, 2022, Bašić signed with HKK Posušje of the Basketball Championship of Bosnia and Herzegovina.

In August 2022, Bašić signed with another club from Herzegovina, Široki. In October 2022, Bašić reinjured his knee and was released from Široki. 

In December, 2022, Bašić signed with Alkar of the Croatian League.

National team career
Bašić played with the Croatia national team youth selections. With the Croatia national under-16 team, he played at the 2011 FIBA Europe Under-16 Championship where he won gold. He also played at the 2014 FIBA Europe Under-20 Championship where Croatia finished fourth.

Bašić debuted for the Croatia national B team at the 2018 Stanković Cup.

References

External links
 Profile at aba-liga.com
 Profile at eurobasket.com
Profile at FIBA (archive)
 Profile at realGM

Living people
1993 births
ABA League players
Croatian men's basketball players
KK Vrijednosnice Osijek players
KK Zadar players
Basketball players from Zadar
Point guards
KK Jazine Arbanasi players
HKK Široki players
KK Alkar players